Reg Barnes (15 December 1920 – 6 August 1999) was an  Australian rules footballer who played with Hawthorn in the Victorian Football League (VFL).

Notes

External links 

1920 births
1999 deaths
Australian rules footballers from Victoria (Australia)
Hawthorn Football Club players